Hoàng Tụy (7 December 1927 – 14 July 2019) was an prominent Vietnamese applied mathematician. He was considered one of two founders of the mathematical institutions of Vietnam; the other was Lê Văn Thiêm.

Career
Hoàng Tụy's early career coincided with the French war (1946–1954), which interrupted his studies. In December 1946, after two months as a mathematics student at Hanoi University, he had to return to the south, because the French had invaded and seized Hanoi, and the University had closed. Hoàng Tụy taught secondary school in Quảng Ngãi province in the Fifth Liberated Zone from 1947 to 1951, during which time he wrote a geometry textbook that was published by the Việt Minh press—perhaps the first time a guerrilla movement published a math book. In the early 1950s, Hoàng Tụy studied with Lê Văn Thiêm in the university that the Việt Minh had opened in a liberated zone in the far north near the Chinese border. In September 1957 he went to the Soviet Union, where he studied real analysis under the supervision of D. E. Menshov and G. E. Shilov. Hoàng Tụy received his PhD in mathematics from Moscow State University in 1959.

After returning to Vietnam from the Soviet Union, Hoàng Tụy changed his area of research from real analysis, which was too theoretical to be of immediate use in Vietnam, to operations research, a field of applied mathematics. It was Hoàng Tụy who first brought that field of research to Vietnam, and who invented the Vietnamese translation vận trù of "operations research." Since that time Hoàng Tụy has worked mainly in the field of global optimization, where he did pioneering work. He had a long career with the Institute of Mathematics of the Vietnamese Academy of Science and Technology, where he was director from 1980 to 1989. He published more than 160 refereed journal and conference articles.

In 1997, a workshop in honor of Hoàng Tụy was organized at Linköping University, Sweden.

In December 2007, an international conference on Nonconvex Programming was held in Rouen, France, to pay tribute to him on the occasion of his 80th birthday, in recognition of his pioneering achievements that advanced the field of global optimization.

In September 2011, Professor Hoàng Tụy was named as the first-ever recipient of the Constantin Carathéodory Prize of the International Society of Global Optimization for his pioneering work and fundamental contributions to global optimization.

Papers
Publications in Math-Net.Ru
 Conical algorithms for solving a concave programming problem and some generalizations S. L. Utkin, V. R. Khachaturov, Hoàng Tụy Zh. Vychisl. Mat. Mat. Fiz., 28:7 (1988), 992–999	
 Solving the linear complementarity problem through concave programming Nguyen Van Thoai, Hoang Tuy Zh. Vychisl. Mat. Mat. Fiz., 23:3 (1983), 602–608	
 Almost affine functions Hoàng Tụy Mat. Zametki, 9:4 (1971), 435–440	
 The structure of measurable functions. II Hoàng Tụy Mat. Sb. (N.S.), 54(96):2 (1961), 177–208	
 On the structure of measurable functions. I Hoàng Tụy Mat. Sb. (N.S.), 53(95):4 (1961), 429–488	
 The “universal primitive” of J. Markusiewicz Hoàng Tụy Izv. Akad. Nauk SSSR Ser. Mat., 24:4 (1960), 617–628

Family
An ancestor of Hoàng Tụy was a famous leader of anti-colonial resistance:

Hoàng Tụy's son, Hoang Duong Tuan, is now a full professor at the University of Technology, Sydney, Australia, where he is working on the applications of optimization in various engineering fields. His son-in-law, Phan Thien Thach, works also on optimization.

References

External links
 An interview in the Optimization Research Bridge newsletter, with tributes from Taketomo Mitsui and Hiroshi Konno.
 Homepage at the Institute of Mathematics

20th-century Vietnamese mathematicians
1927 births
2019 deaths
Moscow State University alumni
People from Quảng Nam province